Hana Financial Group Inc. is a financial holding company headquartered in Seoul, South Korea.

History 
Hana Financial Group was established as Hana Bank's transition to a holding company. In 2005, Hana Bank was delisted and incorporated into Hana Financial Group as a subsidiary.

In 2005, Hana Financial Group acquired Daehan Investment and Securities, then Korea's second-largest asset management company.

In 2012, Hana Financial Group acquired a 51.02 percent stake in Korea Exchange Bank (KEB) from Lone Star Funds for KRW 2.02 trillion. Due to opposition from the KEB labor union, the merger between KEB and Hana Bank was delayed until 2015, and the two banks operated independently under the Hana Financial Group umbrella. An arbitration suit for additional compensation filed by Lone Star was dismissed in May 2019.

Subsidiaries 
Hana Bank
Hana Securities co., LTD (formerly Hana Financial Investment , Hana Daetoo Securities)
KEB Hana Card
Hana Capital
Hana Life (formerly Hana HSBC Insurance)
Hana Insurance
Hana Savings Bank
Hana Asset Trust
Hana Alternative Asset Management
Hana F&I
Hana Ventures
Hana Investor Services
Hana TI
Hana Financial Find
Overseas Units: Hana Bank (China), PT Bank Hana (Indonesia), Hana Asia Limited (Hong Kong)
BNB Hana Bank (Hana acquired BNB Bank in 2013): New Jersey and New York, USA

Hana Financial, Inc. (Los Angeles, CA, USA) is not a member of Hana Financial Group. Founded in 1994, Hana Financial, Inc. is a non-bank financial institution, which offers factoring, asset based lending, and SBA lending.  Hana Financial, Inc. has about $2 billion in annual factoring and loan originations.

Overseas operations
Subsidiaries of Hana Financial Group are active in 24 countries, spanning Asia, the Americas, Europe and the Middle East. In particular, Hana Financial Group has substantial equity investments in banks in China, Indonesia and Vietnam.

In 2007 Hana Financial Group established a subsidiary in China, Hana Bank China. In 2009 Hana Bank China was licensed to perform transactions involving Renminbi and debit card transactions. A year later, Hana Financial Group acquired an 18.44% stake in the Bank of Jilin Co. Ltd. In January, 2011 the group entered into a strategic alliance with the China Merchants Bank.

Bank Bintang Manunggal was acquired by Hana Financial Group in 2007, and renamed PT. Bank Hana in 2008. The Indonesian subsidiary of Hana Financial Group acquired Bank KEB Indonesia as part of the group's global acquisition in 2014, and recently established LINE BANK by Hana Bank, a joint venture with LINE Financial Asia in 2021.

In 2019, Hana Financial Group's subsidiary KEB Hana Bank acquired a 15% stake in Vietnam's BIDV.

See also

List of Banks in South Korea
Daejeon Hana Citizen FC
Bucheon Hana 1Q

References

External links
 

Financial services companies of South Korea
Companies listed on the Korea Exchange
Companies based in Seoul
2005 establishments in South Korea
South Korean brands